Hans-Bert Matoul (born 2 June 1945) is a German former footballer who played as a striker. He is most remembered for being the top scorer in the 1973–74 East German DDR-Oberliga before reunification.

References

External links
 Career stats at RSSSF

1945 births
Living people
People from Harz (district)
German footballers
East German footballers
East Germany international footballers
FC Sachsen Leipzig players
1. FC Lokomotive Leipzig players
Association football forwards
DDR-Oberliga players
Footballers from Saxony-Anhalt